Fagerdala is a company specializing in the development, manufacturing and converting of technical polymer foams, thermoforming parts and resilient materials.

History 
The company was founded as Fagerdala World Foams in 1964 by father and son, Alf and Dag Landvik.

The company’s initial products were Polyurethane mattresses and cushions, before expanding into other foam applications.

In 1989, Fagerdala licensed Tempur-Pedic technology from NASA using its visco elastic material in the manufacture of its pressure-relieving mattresses.

During the 1990s, Polypropylene materials were then utilized to make automotive shock absorbing parts, acquiring an assortment of design patents along the way. The company positioned itself as a polypropylene supplier to the automotive market.

From 2000 onwards, the company developed Polyethylene foam cushion packaging technology to serve the electronic industry.

The company is now a wholly-owned subsidiary of Singaporean-owned company, Sealed Air.

Products 
 EnviroFoam — foam made using 100% recycled EPS foam resins
 Specialty resins
 Packaging
 Automotive
 General applications

Global locations 
 Fagerdala Industri AB (Sweden)
 Fagerdala UK Ltd (United Kingdom)
 Fagerdala Airofom AG (Switzerland)
 Fagerdala-Paclite Inc (USA) — 4 operating locations in 3 states namely: Lompoc, California Marysville and Marine City, Michigan and Indianapolis, Indiana.
 Fagerdala Mexico SA de CV — (Mexico)
 Fagerdala Singapore Pte Ltd (Singapore) — Asia pacific Headquarters
 Fagerdala Malaysia Sdn Bhd (Malaysia)
 Fagerdala Shanghai Foams Co Ltd (China)
 Fagerdala SuZhou Packaging Co Ltd (China)
 Fagerdala Xiamen Packaging Co Ltd (China)
 Maxfoam Do Brasil LTDA (Brazil)
 Gefinex GmbH (Germany)
 Aldlev Srl (Italy)
 Polyciment (France)

References 

Manufacturing companies of Sweden